Helmers is a surname. Notable people with the surname include:

Jan Frederik Helmers (1767–1813), Dutch poet
Knut Jøran Helmers (1957–2021), Norwegian chess player
Matthew Helmers, American engineer